The Iraqi vehicle registration plate is a license plate used for official identification purposes for motor vehicles in Iraq.

Design and format 

Iraq has two official license plate formats. There's one format followed in the Kurdistan Region, and there's another format followed in the rest of Iraq. After months of negotiation, an agreement has been reached between Baghdad and Erbil, where they will unify the design and format of license plates of all governorates of Iraq. Iraqi Kurdistan started issuing the new format for license plates from April 2022. Rest of Iraq are expected to start issuing new license plates in the coming months too.

Rest of Iraq

1988-2001
In 1988, Iraq adopted a new license plate format. This new format applied to all governorates of Iraq.

The license plate was divided in half with a horizontal line. On the bottom right quarter, the name of the country "Al-Iraq" in Arabic is written. On the bottom left quarter, the name of the province in Arabic. On the top of the license plate, there's the registration number.

The color of the plate depended on the classification of the vehicle. Please refer to the section about license plates in Kurdistan Region for more details.

2001-2008
In 2001, the shape and dimensions of the license plates changed, while the general format remained the same. The length of the plate was increased, while its width was reduced. The font of the plate was also changed. The name of the country "Al-Iraq", and the name of the province were moved to the left hand side of the license plate, with the country name above the province name. The coloring and classifications of the new license plates remained unchanged.

2008-

The new license plate format was adopted on 2008. The license plate is rectangular in shape and made of aluminum, with a dimension of 335x155 mm. On the left side, the word "Iraq" appears in English, written vertically. There is a horizontal line that divides the license plate into two sections. In the narrower bottom section, the name of the Province is written, plus the classification of the license plate in Arabic. In the top, the registration code is written, large font in Arabic, and underneath it, smaller font in Latin. The license plate now consists of a letter, and a 5-digit numbers.

Kurdistan Region

1988-2022
The format that was introduced in 1988, continued to be used in the Kurdistan Region until 2022 was adopted in 1988 by all of Iraq. However, since from the year 1992, the Kurdistan Region has had de facto, and from the year 2005, also constitutionally-recognized autonomy, the license format changes that affected the rest of Iraq, were not enforced in the Kurdistan Region. This region still continued to use the format from 1988 until 2022.

The license plate is divided in half with a horizontal line. On the bottom right quarter, the name of the country "Al-Iraq" in Arabic is written. On the bottom left quarter, the name of the province in Arabic. On the top of the license plate, there's the registration number. Currently, the provinces of Erbil, Sulaymaniyah and Dohuk use 6-digit numbers. No information exists as of yet on the province of Halabja

The different classes of the license plates are differentiated by the colour of their background. Besides that, there are no texts or different number or letter on each different class of each plate to differentiate them.

2022-Present
After months of negotiation between Baghdad and Erbil on the issue of finally unifying the design of license plates across the entire country, finally in Spring of 2022, the two sides reached an agreement. The new license plates are going to be fully in Latin Alphabet, and Governorates of Iraq will be represented by a code, instead of their fully name written out. The switch to Latin and to codes resolves two issues. Firstly, it allows for foreign travel of Iraqi cars without a need to install a special plate, and secondly, it would allow Baghdad and Erbil to fully bypass the question of whether the new plates would be in Arabic or Kurdish.

Starting from April 26, the four governorates of Kurdistan Region started issuing the new format of license plate. The rest of Iraq is expected to follow suit in the coming months. The licence plates will be in Standard European size, for the first time in the entirety of Iraq and its license plate history (520mm x 110 mm). There will be a bar on the left hand side, where the code IRQ, representing Iraq will be shown in a vertical manner, and it will also feature a smaller sized code KR, representing Kurdistan Region.

License plates follow the following format: GG X ####, where GG is a two digit code indicating the Governorate. This format is the first time that Halabja Governorate gets its own representation. Another thing to note is that the distribution of the codes between governorates of Iraq outside of Kurdistan Region are not known yet. An interesting fact is that, despite Iraq 19 Governorates, the proposed codes go up to 24 at this stage. It is yet to be clarified why this is the case.
 21 Sulaymaniyah Governorate
 22 Erbil Governorate
 23 Halabja Governorate
 24 Duhok Governorate

The color format will be identical to the current design that the rest of Iraq use, as shown in the table below. However, the type will not be indicated in text on the license plates.

There are plans to replace all existing license plates with this new format. However, since the letter-digit configuration is about to change, certain rules will apply.
 If the existing plate consists of 5 or less digits, the letter A will be placed before the number, and zeros will be added so that the new number would end up being 5 digits.
 If it consists of the following 6 digit numbers: 100000, 200000, .... 900000, one of the zeros will be removed, and the letter M will be placed before the number
 If it consists of any other 6 digit number, and if the first digit is 0 the letter B, if 1 the letter C, if 2 the letter D, ..., and if 9 the letter L will be placed before the number.

Gallery

References

Iraq
Transport in Iraq
Iraq transport-related lists
 Registration plates